List of early American publishers and printers is a stand alone list of Wikipedia articles about publishers and printers in colonial and early America, intended as a quick reference, with basic descriptions taken from the ledes of the respective articles. 

 Jane Aitken  1764–1832Printer, publisher, bookbinder, and bookseller in Philadelphia; Sister of Robert Aitken, who continued his business when he died. Printed and bound dozens of books for the Athenaeum of Philadelphia and about 400 volumes for the American Philosophical Society

 Robert Aitken (publisher)  1734–1802Philadelphia printer and the first to publish an English language Bible in the U.S. 

 Benjamin Franklin Bache  1769–1798Journalist, printer and publisher. Founded the Philadelphia Aurora, a newspaper that supported Jeffersonian philosophy, known for its attacks on Federalist leaders, including George Washington. Known for polarizing the press, prompting the Alien and Sedition Acts

 Francis Bailey (publisher)  1744—1817Revolutionary War printer, publisher and journalist in Pennsylvania from 1771 to 1807.  First printer to publicly refer to George Washington as the "Father of his country"; First to print the Articles of Confederation.

 Andrew Barclay (bookbinder)  1737-1823Bookbinder in Boston and New York during the American Revolution; Loyalist

 Robert Bell (publisher)  1725-1784Printing Thomas Paine's celebrated work, Common Sense

 Andrew Bradford  1686–1742Printer in colonial Philadelphia. He published the first newspaper in Philadelphia, The American Weekly Mercury,

 William Bradford (printer, born 1663)  1660–1752English printer and publisher in colonial British America, known as founder of the press in the middle colonies 

 William Bradford (printer, born 1719)  1719–1791Publisher of The Pennsylvania Journal, Grandson of the printer William Bradford 

 John Campbell (editor) — 1653–1728Newspaper editor in Boston; founded the first regularly published newspaper in the British colonies in America, The Boston News-Letter

 Mathew Carey  1760–1839Irish-born American publisher and economist from  Philadelphia, founder of The Pennsylvania Herald, with the help of Benjamin Franklin and Lafayette

 Francis Childs (printer)  ()publisher and printer of The New York Daily Advertiser; printer for the newly established United States government in 1783
 
 John Carter (printer)  1745-1814Printer and publisher; Published The Providence Gazette with William Goddard in Rhode Island; Apprentice of Benjamin Franklin

 Isaac Collins (printer)  1746–1817Printer, publisher; published New Jersey Gazette and New Jersey Almanac; Noted for his famous 1791 bible; politically active during American Revolution; printed continental currency
 
 John Day (printer)  1522–1584English Protestant printer; Specialized in printing and distributing Protestant literature

 James Davis (printer)  1721–1785 First printer and postmaster of North Carolina. Founder and printer of the North-Carolina Gazette

 Stephen Daye  1594–1668Immigrant from England to British colony of Massachusetts; Became the first printer in colonial America

 Gregory Dexter — (1610–1700)Printer, Baptist minister, early President of the combined towns of Providence and Warwick in the Colony of Rhode Island.

 Thomas Dobson (printer)  1751–1823Master printer; Famous for publishing the earliest American version of the Encyclopedia Britannica; First in the U.S. to publish a complete Hebrew Bible
 
 John Dunlap  1747–1812Irish printer, printed the first copies of the United States Declaration of Independence
 
 Benjamin Edes  1732–1803Journalist newspaper publisher and advocate of the American Revolution. Publisher of the Boston Gazette along with John Gill. Also published The Boston Gazette and Country Journal John Fenno  1751–1798Federalist Party editor; Founder of Gazette of the United States which played a major role in shaping party politics in the United States in the 1790s. 

 Thomas Fleet (printer)  (1685-1758)Booksellers, printer;  established the Boston Evening Post 

 John Foster (printer)  1648–1681Printer and engraver; credited with producing the first engravings in British colonial America and the official seals of the Massachusetts Bay Colony

 Daniel Fowle (printer)  1715–1787Arrested in Massachusetts for seditious printing; Founder of the New Hampshire Gazette Benjamin Franklin  1705–1790World famous American founding father, postmaster, printer, inventor and scientist
 
 James Franklin (printer)  1697–1735Colonial author, printer, newspaper publisher, and almanac publisher. Published the New England Courant, one of the oldest independent American newspapers; Older brother of Benjamin Franklin 

 Hugh Gaine  1726–1807Irish  printer, bookseller, and newspaper publisher; Publisher of The New York Mercury John Gill (printer)  1732-1785Printer in Boston, Massachusetts;  Gill issued The Boston Gazette newspaper with Benjamin Edes; He later published The Continental Journal Sarah Updike Goddard  1701–1770printer, co-founder publisher of The Providence Gazette; Mother of William Goddard and Mary Katherine Goddard, also noted colonial printers

 Daniel Henchman (publisher)  1689-1761Boston's largest book seller and publisher before the American revolution. Built the first papermill in New England. Published the first Bible printed in the English language to appear in the American colonies.

 Mary Katherine Goddard  1738–1816Publisher and postmaster of Baltimore Post Office; Older sister of William Goddard

 William Goddard (publisher)  1740–1817 Patriot, publisher, printer and postal inspector; Worked closely with Benjamin Franklin in establishing colonial postal system

 Bartholomew Green Sr. (printer)  1666–1732Printer and later the publisher of The Boston News-Letter Samuel Green (printer)  1614–1702American printer, progenitor of the Green family of printers; one of the first American printers in Cambridge

 Jonas Green  early 1700s–1767Newspaper publisher together with wife Anne Catherine Hoof Green in Colonial Maryland; Strong opponent of The Stamp Act

 David Hall (printer)  1714–1772Printer, business partner of Benjamin Franklin in Philadelphia. Eventually took over Franklin's printing business in Pennsylvania and The Pennsylvania Gazette Samuel Hall (printer)  1740-1807Editor and founder of The Essex Gazette, the first newspaper to appear in Salem Massachusetts in 1768.

 Benjamin Harris (publisher)  1673-1716English publisher, involved in the Popish Plot in England; Moved to New England as an early journalist; Published the New England Primer, the first textbook in British America, and edited the first multi-page newspaper there, Publick Occurrences Both Forreign and Domestick 
 Nicholas Hasselbach (printer) — (1749-1769)Printer and paper mill owner who lived in Philadelphia and then Baltimore. First printer to set up a printing press in Baltimore.

 Anthony Haswell (printer)  1756–1816English immigrant to New England; Newspaper, almanac, and book publisher; Postmaster General of Vermont; Jeffersonian printer imprisoned under the Sedition Act of 1798

 John Holt (publisher)  1721–1784Newspaper publisher, printer, postmaster, mayor of Williamsburg, Virginia; Helped publish the Connecticut Gazette, The New York Gazette, and The New-York Journal; Worked with Benjamin Franklin, Samuel Adams and The Sons of Liberty; Published articles against the Stamp Act of 1765

 James Humphreys (printer)  1748–1810Printer, publisher, politician in Nova Scotia and Pennsylvania; Printing apprentice of William Bradford

 William Hunter (publisher)  early 1700s–1761Newspaper publisher, book publisher, and official government printer for the colony of Virginia

 Samuel Keimer  1689–1742 English printer and emigrant; Original founder of The Pennsylvania Gazette who sold it to Benjamin Franklin in 1729

 Samuel Kneeland (printer)  1696-1769Printer and publisher of The Boston Gazette

 Samuel Loudon   (1727-1813) Founder and printer  of The New-York Packet and The American Advertiser;  Postmaster in Fishkill, New York, during the American Revolutionary War

 Hugh Meredith  1697–1749Farmer and printer; Briefly had a partnership with Benjamin Franklin as publishers of The Pennsylvania Gazette 

 John Henry Miller  1702-1782Was employed by Benjamin Franklin and William Bradford to superintend their German printing as a translator of German into English.; Published the Gazette of Lancaster, Pennsylvania, in 1752, and from 1762 to 1779 Der Wöchentliche Philadelphische Staatsbote James Parker (publisher)  1714–1770Printer, publisher, apprentice of Benjamin Franklin who later appointed him Postmaster of the colonies; Set up first print shop in New Jersey; Was a printer for Yale College, and general manager of the first public library in New York City

 William Parks (publisher)  1699–1750Printer, journalist in England and Colonial America; First printer in Maryland officially authorized  printer for the colonial government; Published first newspaper in Southern American colonies, The Maryland Gazette Richard Pierce (publisher)  ?-1691 Publisher who printed Publick Occurrences Both Forreign and Domestick for Benjamin Harris, generally considered the first newspaper printed in America

 Alexander Purdie (publisher)  1743–1779Printer, publisher, in colonial Williamsburg, Virginia; Printed the laws and legislative journals for the colonial government of Virginia
 
 Clementina Rind  1740–1774First female newspaper printer and publisher in Virginia, who took over The Virginia Gazette, founded by husband, William, upon his death; Published Thomas Jefferson's tract A Summary View of the Rights of British America James Rivington  1724–1802Published a Loyalist newspaper called Rivington's Gazette Joseph Royle (publisher)  1732–1766Newspaper publisher and printer for the colony of Virginia; Apprentice of William Hunter

 Benjamin Russell (journalist)  1761–1845Established the Columbian Centinel and was one of the founding members of the American Antiquarian Society

 Solomon Southwick  (1773–1839)Printer and publisher, publisher  of  Newport Mercury; principal organizer of the Anti-Masonic Party. 

 Christopher Sower (elder)  1693–1758First German-language printer and publisher in North America;

 Christopher Sower (younger)  1721–1784clergyman and printer; Son of Christopher Sower, elder

 Christopher Sower III  1754–1799Printer and publisher in Pennsylvania; Loyalist during the American Revolution; Son of Christopher Sower (younger)

 William Strahan (publisher)  1715–1785Printer, publisher, and politician who sat in the House of Commons between from 1774 to 1784; Friend of Benjamin Franklin

 Isaiah Thomas (publisher)  1749–1831Newspaper publisher and author. Performed first public reading of the Declaration of Independence in Worcester, Massachusetts; Reported first account of the Battles of Lexington and Concord; Founder of the American Antiquarian Society

 Louis Timothee  1699–1738Printer colonial Pennsylvania and South Carolina; Worked for Benjamin Franklin, publishing newspapers, including The Pennsylvania Gazette, The South Carolina Gazette; Served as a part-time librarian in 1732 for the Library Company of Philadelphia

 Ann Timothy  1727–1792Newspaper publisher from South Carolina; Became the official printer for the state of South Carolina

 Elizabeth Timothy  1700–1757Printer, newspaper publisher in colony of South Carolina who worked for Benjamin Franklin; First female in America to become a newspaper publisher 

 Peter Timothy  1724–1782Printer and politician. Immigrated to the American colonies with his parents and worked for Benjamin Franklin 

 Benjamin Towne  mid 1700s–1793Published The Pennsylvania Evening Post; published the first daily newspaper in the U.S.; First to publish the United States Declaration of Independence in a newspaper

 William Williams (printer and publisher)  (1787-1850Printer and publisher of several newspapers in Utica, New York. An elder of the first Presbyterian Church in Utica.

 John Peter Zenger  1697–1746Famous for the 1733 landmark case where he was accused of printing libelous material about William Cosby, the colonial governor in New York;  Andrew Hamilton and William Smith, Sr.  successfully defended him in New York, maintaining that telling the truth was a legitimate defense in libel cases.

American printers
American journalists
American Revolution
18th-century American newspaper publishers (people)
17th-century newspaper publishers (people)
Colonial American printers